The fourth season of The Rockford Files originally aired Fridays at 9:00-10:00 pm on NBC from September 16, 1977 to February 24, 1978.

Episodes

1977 American television seasons
1978 American television seasons
The Rockford Files seasons